was a town located in Funai District, Kyoto Prefecture, Japan.

As of 2003, the town had an estimated population of 16,958 and a population density of 164.99 people per km². The total area was 102.78 km².

On January 1 2006, Sonobe, along with the towns of Hiyoshi and Yagi (all from Funai District), and the town of Miyama (from Kitakuwada District), was merged to create the city of Nantan.

Sonobe served as the administrative center of Nantan. It is the birthplace and home town of the video game designer and Nintendo's representative director Shigeru Miyamoto.

Gallery

External links
 Official website of Nantan 

Populated places disestablished in 2006
Dissolved municipalities of Kyoto Prefecture
2006 disestablishments in Japan
Nantan, Kyoto